Gowd may be:
  a common element in Iranian place names; see 
 Gowd, Bushehr, a village in Iran
 an alternative spelling for the Goud and Gaud social groups in India

See also
 M. S. Gowd, Indian dental surgeon
 Goude (disambiguation)